Hassan Moumen  is a Moroccan football coach who was appointed manager of the Moroccan national side in July 2009. Moumen also managed Moroccan club side FUS de Rabat.

References

Date of birth missing (living people)
Living people
Moroccan football managers
Fath Union Sport managers
Morocco national football team managers
Year of birth missing (living people)